Bengü is a common Turkish given name. It means "eternal", "endless", "never-ending", or "immortal".

People with this name include:
 Bengü Erden, Turkish pop music singer
 Bengü Orhan, a contestant in the second cycle of Holland's Next Top Model
 Bengü Türk, a player in Galatasaray Women's Basketball Team past rosters
 Bengü Aydoğdu, a Writer Kitapları: Anka Kuşunun Çağrısı, Çöl Analarının ve Çöl Babalarının Deyimleri

Turkish feminine given names